Asian Puerto Ricans are Puerto Ricans who trace their ancestry to the continent of Asia, mostly from China, India, and especially Palestinian Territories, Jordan, Lebanon and Syria (see Arab).

As of 2010, people of Asian descent are a small minority in Puerto Rico that constitutes 0.2% of the population.

See also
 Chinese immigration to Puerto Rico
 Indo-Caribbean

References and footnotes 

 
Ethnic groups in Puerto Rico